Erik Simonson (born May 26, 1968) is a Minnesota politician and former member of the Minnesota Senate. A member of the Minnesota Democratic–Farmer–Labor Party (DFL), he represented District 7 which includes the city of Duluth in St. Louis County in northeastern Minnesota.

Early life
Simonson was born in Duluth, Minnesota.

Minnesota legislature
Simonson was first elected to the Minnesota House of Representatives in 2012 representing District 7B and served two terms.

Simonson was then elected to the Minnesota Senate in 2016.

Simonson served on the following committees during his tenure:

 Ranking Minority Member Energy and Utilities Finance and Policy
 Environment and Natural Resources Finance
 Jobs and Economic Growth Finance and Policy

In 2020, Simonson was not endorsed by the DFL and was defeated in the primary election on August 11 to Jen McEwen.

Personal life
Simonson was an assistant chief for the Duluth Fire Department, retiring after serving as a firefighter for 27 years. He is married and has two children.

After leaving his role as a legislator, Simonson became a lobbyist with Saint Paul-based law firm Flaherty and Hood.

References

External links

Rep. Erik Simonson official Minnesota House of Representatives website
Rep. Erik Simonson official campaign website

1968 births
Living people
Members of the Minnesota House of Representatives
21st-century American politicians